David Souto (born 26 March 1992 in Caracas) is a Venezuelan tennis player.

Souto has a career high ATP singles ranking of 208 achieved on 21 April 2014. He also has a career high ATP doubles ranking of 307 achieved on 28 April 2014.

In juniors, Souto has a career high combined ranking of 10 achieved in 2009.

Souto has represented Venezuela at the Davis Cup where he has a W/L record of 9–5.

External links

1992 births
Living people
Venezuelan male tennis players
Sportspeople from Valencia
Tennis players from Caracas
Central American and Caribbean Games silver medalists for Venezuela
Central American and Caribbean Games bronze medalists for Venezuela
South American Games gold medalists for Venezuela
South American Games medalists in tennis
Competitors at the 2014 South American Games
Competitors at the 2014 Central American and Caribbean Games
Central American and Caribbean Games medalists in tennis
20th-century Venezuelan people
21st-century Venezuelan people